Casey Elliot Thomas (born 14 November 1990) is a Welsh footballer and Wales under-21 international who plays as a Central Midfielder for Moreland City FC.

Club career
Thomas made his professional debut for Swansea City in a Championship match against Middlesbrough in the 3–0 loss on 15 August 2009, replacing Mark Gower as a substitute in the 62nd minute. In October 2009, Thomas joined Conference South side Newport County on a one-month loan deal. He made one appearance as a substitute during a 1–0 defeat to Staines Town on 27 October, after which he returned to Swansea City. In January 2011, Thomas moved to Port Talbot Town on loan. On 4 November 2011, he joined League One club Colchester United on loan until 2 January 2012. Thomas was released in May 2012 and joined Carmarthen Town of the Welsh Premier League. In September 2013, Thomas signed for fellow Welsh Premier League club Afan Lido. Following Afan Lido's relegation from the Welsh Premier in 2014, Thomas joined rival club Port Talbot Town.

In February 2015, Thomas moved with his brother Corey to Australia to join Moreland City FC.

International career
Thomas has represented Wales under-17 and Wales under-19, where he played twice scoring one goal. He was called up to the under-21 squad, to face Luxembourg under-21 in March 2009.

References

External links
Casey Thomas profile at swanseacity.net

1990 births
Living people
Sportspeople from Port Talbot
Welsh footballers
Wales under-21 international footballers
Association football forwards
Afan Lido F.C. players
Swansea City A.F.C. players
Newport County A.F.C. players
Port Talbot Town F.C. players
Colchester United F.C. players
English Football League players